Paeonian Springs Historic District is a national historic district located at Paeonian Springs, Loudoun County, Virginia.  It encompasses 58 contributing buildings, 1 contributing site, and 1 contributing structure in the village of Paeonian Springs.  It is primarily residential, but also includes several former commercial
buildings, two former boardinghouses, a former school and private academy, the former water bottling plant, as well as the former public springhouse and spring site. The majority of the dwellings range in date from about 1880 to 1910. Notable buildings include Chanbourne, Buckhill III, Vanderventer Inn, Shiflett House, and the former Spinks Mercantile (c. 1905).

It was listed on the National Register of Historic Places in 2006.

References

Historic districts in Loudoun County, Virginia
National Register of Historic Places in Loudoun County, Virginia
Historic districts on the National Register of Historic Places in Virginia